Wellsboro is an unincorporated community in Noble Township, LaPorte County, Indiana.

History
Wellsboro was laid out in 1875 at the junction of two railroads. It was named for its founders, Charles F. and Theodore H. Wells. Wellsboro (originally spelled Wellsborough) contained a post office from 1877 until 1955.

Geography

References

Unincorporated communities in LaPorte County, Indiana
Unincorporated communities in Indiana